Milena Nekvapilová (born 9 May 1977) is a Czech former tennis player.

She has career-high WTA rankings of 214 in singles, achieved on 17 November 1997, and 146 in doubles, set on 22 February 1999. Nekvapilová won four singles titles and 21 doubles titles on the ITF Women's Circuit.

She made her WTA Tour main-draw debut in the doubles event of the 1999 Belgian Open partnering Hana Šromová.

Nekvapilová retired from professional tennis in 2009.

ITF finals

Singles: 8 (4–4)

Doubles: 41 (21–20)

External links
 
 

1977 births
Living people
Czech female tennis players